EK or Emma-Kate Lidbury is a female British professional triathlete who currently resides in Boulder, Colorado. She previously lived in Los Angeles, California. She began training for triathlons in 2005 and decided to devote her full-time to the sport in the fall of 2008. She specialized at the Ironman 70.3 distance, winning her first titles in 2011 at 70.3 Mallorca, 70.3 UK and 70.3 Augusta. In 2012 she successfully defended her title at 70.3 Mallorca. In 2013 she had two 1st-place finishes, one at Ironman 70.3 Texas and the other at Ironman 70.3 Kansas. Lidbury finished 10th at the Ironman 70.3 World Championship in 2010 and 8th the following year. 

Since retiring from professional racing she has returned to her writing and journalistic roots, co-authoring the book Triathlon Swimming with Gerry Rodrigues for VeloPress. She worked as Managing Editor at Triathlete Magazine from 2019 to 2022.

References 

Living people
British female triathletes
People from Wiltshire
English female triathletes
Year of birth missing (living people)